Two ships of the Royal Navy have been named HMS Leeds Castle after Leeds Castle, near Maidstone in Kent.

 is a  launched in 1980.

Battle honours
 Atlantic 1945
 Falkland Islands 1982

Royal Navy ship names